How to Write History is the title of a study by the classical Syrian writer Lucian, which may be considered the only work on the theory of history-writing to survive from antiquity.

Themes
The first part of Lucian’s essay involved a critical attack on contemporary historians.  Lucian maintained that they confused history with panegyric, overloaded it with irrelevant details, and weighed it down with overblown rhetoric. 

Lucian recommended instead the virtues of clear narration, and the valorisation of truth. He argued that the historian should write for all times, as “a free man, fearless, incorruptible, the friend of truth”; and held up the work of Thucydides as the legislative template for all subsequent historians.

Later influence
The early Renaissance saw the essay taken up by figures like Guarino da Verona and Giovanni Pontano.

Edward Gibbon, who wrote of “the inimitable Lucian”, owned the 1776 edition of Quomodo Historia Conscribenda Sit (Oxford)

See also
Anneus Florus
A True History
Polybius

References

External links
 
 
 The Way to Write History

Ancient Greek works
Works by Lucian
2nd-century books